Great Jones is an American property management firm based in New York, NY.  It was founded by Jay Goldklang, Abigail Besdin, and David Diaz with offices in Florida, Indiana, and North Carolina. They allow clients to manage their rental homes via smartphone or the internet and acting as a Group Purchasing Organization (GPO) cutting costs through consolidated purchasing for materials used in property maintenance via a mobile phone and desktop portal.

In 2018, the company raised $8 million in Series A financing from Crosslink Capital, Juxtapose, and several New York City real estate and technology entrepreneurs, including Floored founder Dave Eisenberg, Seamless founder Jason Finger, and serial entrepreneurs Kevin Ryan and David Rosenblatt.

The firm manages more than 1,000 properties valued at more than $150m in locations from Naples to Jacksonville and has expanded to the Midwest and the Carolinas.

References 

Property management companies
Companies based in Tampa, Florida
Companies with year of establishment missing